Órlaith íngen Cennétig, was Queen of Ireland. She was executed in 941.

Background

Órlaith appears to be the only recorded daughter of King Cennétig mac Lorcáin of Thomond (died 951). Her siblings included Mathgamain mac Cennétig (King of Munster c.970-976) and Brian Bóruma (King of Ireland 1002–14). She was the second consort of the Irish High King Donnchad Donn.

Adultery and execution

Órlaith was accused of adultery with her stepson, Óengus mac Donnchad Donn. Found guilty, she was executed, though the manner of her death is uncertain. Óengus survived and lived to succeed his father. It is uncertain if she had any offspring.

Annalistic reference

The Chronicon Scotorum; sub anno 941, state that "Órlaith daughter of Cennétigh son of Lorcán was slain by Donnchad son of Flann, king of Ireland, having been charged (with illicit sexual relations) with Óengus, his son."

See also
 Órlaith

References
 Byrne, Francis John, Irish Kings and High-Kings. Batsford, London, 1973.

External links
 http://www.ucc.ie/celt/published/T100016/index.html
 

941 deaths
Irish royal consorts
10th-century Irish women
People from County Clare
People from County Meath
10th-century Irish people
Nobility from County Limerick
10th-century executions
Executed royalty
People executed for adultery
Year of birth unknown
Gaels